Halka Na Lo (English: Don't take it easy) is a 2012 Pakistani sitcom aired every Friday on Hum TV. It was first aired on 31 August 2012 directed by Salman Abbas and written by Rizwan Hassan. Sitcom stars Agha Sheraz, Zhalay Sarhadi, Barkat Ali and Uzmi.

Cast 

 Agha Sheraz as Amir
 Zhalay Sarhadi as Zobi
 Barkat Ali as Salman
 Uzmi as Ghalib

Written By : Rizwan Hasan

Produced & Directed By : Salman Abbas Nomi

For HUM T.V

References

External links 
 Official website
 

Hum TV original programming
Urdu-language television shows
2012 Pakistani television series debuts
Pakistani television sitcoms